Bart Prince (born June 24, 1947) is an American architect based in Albuquerque, New Mexico. He is best known for his highly organic style of architecture.

Biography
Prince was born in New Mexico and is a graduate of Highland High School and Arizona State University. He opened his own practice in Albuquerque in 1973. He counts as his architectural inspirations: Frank Lloyd Wright, Antoni Gaudi, and Bruce Goff, the latter to whom Prince was a former student and assistant. He accounts the inspiration for his individual creativity to Claude Debussy and Pablo Picasso.

Prince worked closely with Bruce Goff when they were associate architects on the Pavilion for Japanese Art in Los Angeles from 1978 to 1988.

Prince's great-grandfather was L. Bradford Prince, the governor of New Mexico Territory from 1889 to 1893.

His home and studio in Albuquerque is uniquely characteristic of his novel creativity.

Selected works
The following is a selection of works by Prince that best exemplify his style:
1982: Dale and Margo Seymour Residence, Los Altos, California
1984: Bart Prince Residence and Studio, Albuquerque, New Mexico
1988: Pavilion for Japanese Art at the Los Angeles County Museum of Art (with Bruce Goff), Los Angeles, California 
1988: Bradford Prince Residence, Albuquerque, New Mexico
1989: Joe and Etsuko Price Residence (and an addition in 1996), Corona del Mar, California 
1991: Henry Whiting Residence, near Sun Valley, Idaho
1991: Judy and Stuart Spence Residence, South Pasadena, California
1993: George Gradow / Barbi Benton Residence, Aspen, Colorado
1993: Boyd and Mary Kay Hight Residence, near Mendocino, California
1993: Christopher Mead / Michele Penhall Residence, Albuquerque, New Mexico
1998: Borden / Wiegner Residence, Jemez Springs, New Mexico
1999: Steve Skilken Residence, Columbus, Ohio
2002: Fu Residence, Rio Rancho, New Mexico
2004: Parsifal Townhomes, Albuquerque, New Mexico
2004: Whitmore Residence, Glorieta, New Mexico
2005: Dan Scherger and Suzanne Kolberg Residence, Albuquerque, New Mexico

References 

Living people
Architects from New Mexico
People from Albuquerque, New Mexico
Arizona State University alumni
1947 births